Let Them Eat Pussy is the major label debut album by American rock band Nashville Pussy, released on February 24, 1998. AllMusic, in a four-star review, said "Let Them Eat Pussy is all about sleaze, and it's the sleaziest record in years". The album helped to create a fanbase for the band, and the song "Fried Chicken and Coffee" was nominated for a Grammy Award in the category of Best Metal Performance.

Track listing
All songs written by Blaine Cartwright, except where noted. 
 "Snake Eyes" – 1:29
 "You're Goin' Down" – 2:08
 "Go Motherfucker Go" – 1:59
 "I'm the Man" – 2:16
 "All Fucked Up" – 1:51
 "Johnny Hotrod" – 2:56
 "5 Minutes to Live" – 2:19
 "Somebody Shoot Me" – 2:09
 "Blowin' Smoke" – 1:34
 "First I Look at the Purse" (Smokey Robinson, Bobby Rogers) – 2:05
 "Eat My Dust" – 1:50
 "Fried Chicken and Coffee" – 4:26

Eat More Pussy EP track listing
 "Kicked in the Teeth" – 3:25 (written by Angus Young, Malcolm Young and Bon Scott; originally performed by AC/DC)
 "Nice Boys" – 2:47 (written by Gary Anderson, Peter Wells, Mick Cocks, Geordie Leach and Dallas Royall; originally performed by Rose Tattoo)
 "Milk Cow Blues" – 3:07 (written and originally performed by Kokomo Arnold)
 "Headin' for the Texas Border" – 2:58 (written by Cyril Jordan and Roy Loney; originally performed by The Flamin' Groovies)
 "Sock It to Me Baby" – 2:24 (written by L. Russell Brown and Bob Crewe; originally performed by Mitch Ryder & The Detroit Wheels)
 "(I'm) Misunderstood" – 2:35 (written by Chris Bailey and Ed Kuepper; originally performed by The Saints)

The Eat More Pussy EP was included in the UK as a bonus disc.

References

1998 debut albums
Nashville Pussy albums
The Enclave (record label) albums
Albums produced by Kurt Bloch